Bettie Sue Siler Masters is an adjunct professor at Duke University known for her work on nitric oxide synthase and cytochrome P450 reductase. She was the 1992 recipient of the FASEB Excellence in Science Award, and has been elected as a member of the National Academy of Medicine and as a fellow of the American Association for the Advancement of Science.

Early life and education 
Masters was born in Lexington, Virginia, where her father was a radio announcer and a singer. As a child she was an avid reader of Sherlock Holmes and Dr. Watson whose analytical skills she admired. She became interested in chemistry during her sophomore year in high school, and placed high enough in the Westinghouse Science Talent Search to receive a scholarship for college. After the College of William & Mary would not accept the scholarship because she was a woman, she went on to attend Roanoke College, thereby becoming a first-generation college student. She graduated from Roanoke College in 1959 with a B.S. in chemistry. In 1963, she earned her Ph.D. in biochemistry from Duke University.

Career 
Following her Ph.D. work, she conducted postdoctoral research first with fellowship support from the American Cancer Society and then with grant support from the American Heart Association. In 1968, she moved to the University of Texas Southwestern Medical School where she started her research lab. In 1982, she moved to the Medical College of Wisconsin to accept the position as chair of the department of biochemistry, thereby becoming the first woman to hold this position. In 1990, she moved to the University of Texas Health Science Center at San Antonio where she was named as the Robert A. Welch Distinguished Professor in Chemistry. As of 2022, she is an adjunct professor at Duke University in the department of biochemistry.

Research 
Masters is known for her work on the structure and function of enzymes. As a graduate student she characterized cytochrome P450 reductase (NADPH-cytochrome P450 oxidoreductase). She went on to develop methods to purify enzymes, such as cytochrome P450 reductase, which allows investigation into their biochemical properties and identification of the active sites of the protein through x-ray crystallography. Concerning nitric oxide synthase, she examined the atomic structure of the endothelial isoenzyme, the zinc bound within the protein, and the co-factors required (heme and tetrahydrobiopterin).

Selected publications

Awards and honors 
Masters has received numerous honors and awards from Roanoke College, her alma mater. In 1973, she was awarded the Roanoke College Medal for her distinguished service to her community and her profession. In 1983, she received an Honorary Doctor of Science degree from Roanoke College.

In 1990, Masters was recruited to the University of Texas Health Science Center at San Antonio as the first Robert A. Welch Distinguished Professor in Chemistry. In 1992, Masters received the Excellence in Science Award from the Federation of American Societies for Experimental Biology (FASEB). In 2000, she was the recipient of the Bernard B. Brodie Award in Drug Metabolism from the American Society for Pharmacology and Experimental Therapeutics. In 1996, Masters was elected as a member of the National Academy of Medicine and, in 2001, she was elected as a fellow of the American Association for the Advancement of Science. In 2005, Charles University (Prague) awarded Masters an honorary degree, Doctorem Medicinae Honoris Causae, in recognition of her work. In 2022, the Medical College of Wisconsin (MCW) awarded Masters an Honorary Doctor of Science degree in recognition of her leadership role in the field of biochemistry and her contributions to medical scientist training (via initiation of MCW's MD/PhD training program--Medical Scientist Training Program).

References 

Living people
1937 births
Roanoke College alumni
Duke University alumni
Fellows of the American Association for the Advancement of Science
Members of the National Academy of Medicine
Duke University faculty
University of Texas Health Science Center at San Antonio faculty
Medical College of Wisconsin faculty
University of Texas Southwestern Medical Center faculty
American biochemists
American women biochemists
20th-century American biochemists
21st-century American biochemists
Medical educators
20th-century American women scientists
21st-century American women scientists